John Thomas (12 April 1852 – 29 May 1915) was an Australian cricketer. He played one first-class match for Tasmania in 1870.

See also
 List of Tasmanian representative cricketers

References

External links
 

1852 births
1915 deaths
Australian cricketers
Tasmania cricketers
Sportspeople from Merthyr Tydfil